Izvestiya: Mathematics is the English translation of the Russian mathematical journal Izvestiya Rossiiskoi Akademii Nauk, Seriya Matematicheskaya which was founded in 1937. Since 1995, the journal has been published jointly by Turpion, the Russian Academy of Sciences, and the London Mathematical Society.

The journal covers all fields of mathematics but pays special attention to: algebra, algebraic geometry, mathematical logic, number theory, mathematical analysis, geometry, topology, and differential equations.

Since 2008 electronic access to the content back to the first English translation volume has been hosted by IOP Publishing.

The Editor in Chief is V. V. Kozlov, Steklov Institute of Mathematics, Russian Academy of Sciences, Moscow, Russia.

Indexing and abstracting
The journal is indexed in the following bibliographic databases:
Web of Science (SCI-E)
MathSciNet
Scopus
NASA Astrophysical Data  System														
INIS

External links
Izvestiya Mathematics on IOPscience (IOP Publishing)
London Mathematical Society
Russian Academy of Sciences
Turpion

References

Mathematics journals
Publications established in 1937
Russian Academy of Sciences academic journals
London Mathematical Society